Manzonia boavistensis is a species of minute sea snail, a marine gastropod mollusk or micromollusk in the family Rissoidae. It has been found off the islands of Boa Vista and Sal, Cape Verde.

References

boavistensis
Gastropods of Cape Verde
Fauna of Boa Vista, Cape Verde
Gastropods described in 1987